Charles-Nicolas Odiot (died 1869) was the outstanding French silversmith of his generation; the son of Napoleon's silversmith, Jean-Baptiste-Claude Odiot, he inherited the direction of the extensive family workshops in 1827, as techniques of factory production were extended in the trade. He excelled in the revived Rococo style, and became the purveyor by appointment to Louis-Philippe of France and to other members of the family of Orléans. 
 
He was succeeded in turn by his son Gustave, who received the most ambitious command ever to be accepted by the House of Odiot: 3,000 pieces of solid gold tableware for Saïd Pasha,  Viceroy of Egypt. He later became the purveyor by appointment to the court of the Tsar. Gustave was also the last member of the Odiot family to preside over the company, which continues in business today.

The Odiot Demidov service
The silver service commissioned from the Maison Odiot by Prince Paul Demidovf in 1831 is an excellent example of the Romantic revival of the Rococo.  

French silversmiths
Year of birth missing
1869 deaths